Tetraspidium is a genus of flowering plants belonging to the family Orobanchaceae.

Its native range is Madagascar.

Species:

Tetraspidium laxiflorum

References

Orobanchaceae
Orobanchaceae genera